Race Riot is a compilation album released by Spitfire on July 18, 2000. The album consists of such popular names as M.O.P., Insane Clown Posse and Machine Head among others.

Album cover
The album cover makes a reference to N.W.A.'s 100 Miles and Runnin'.

Track listing

References

Hip hop compilation albums
Rap rock compilation albums
2000 soundtrack albums
2000 compilation albums
Spitfire Records compilation albums